Anolis pigmaequestris, the pygmy giant anole or Cayko Frances anole, is a species of lizard in the family Dactyloidae. The species is found in Cuba.

References

Anoles
Reptiles described in 1975
Endemic fauna of Cuba
Reptiles of Cuba
Taxa named by Orlando H. Garrido